Ugo Pifferi (15 April 1930 – 1 September 1998) was an Italian rower. He competed in the men's single sculls event at the 1952 Summer Olympics.

References

External links
 

1930 births
1998 deaths
Italian male rowers
Olympic rowers of Italy
Rowers at the 1952 Summer Olympics
Rowers from Milan